Vincent Warren Low  (1 September 1867 – 	2 September 1942) was a British surgeon.

Biography
After education at Cranleigh School, V. Warren Low studied medicine in London at St Mary's Hospital. He qualified MRCS in 1891. In 1892 he graduated MB (Lond). In 1893 he graduated BS (Lond) and was elected FRCS. In 1895 he graduated with the higher MD. During the Second Boer War he served from 1899 to 1902 as a civil surgeon with the British field force and was awarded the Queen's South Africa Medal with seven clasps. When he returned to England, he was briefly an assistant surgeon at the Great Northern Hospital. At St Mary's Hospital, he became an assistant surgeon, a lecturer in surgery, and a surgeon, eventually retiring as consulting surgeon. He was elected a governor and vice-president of St Mary's Hospital.

During WWI he served as a temporary colonel in the Army Medical Service. He served in the Gallipoli Campaign and in Egypt as consulting surgeon to the troops in the Mediterranean. For his military service he was mentioned in despatches and in 1916 was created CB (military division).

Low was president of the Royal Society of Medicine from 1932 to 1934 and president of the Society's section of surgery in 1927–1928.

On 31 May 1902 at St Mary's, Staines, V. Warren Low married Mabel Ashley, eldest daughter of John Ashley, J.P. When Low died in 1942, the day after his 75th birthday, he was survived by his widow, four sons, and two daughters. The youngest of the four sons, Roger Vincent Low, was on the Oxford rowing team in the 1930 Boat Race between Oxford and Cambridge.

Selected publications

References

1867 births
1942 deaths
People educated at Cranleigh School
Alumni of St Mary's Hospital Medical School
Physicians of St Mary's Hospital, London
Companions of the Order of the Bath
British surgeons
Fellows of the Royal College of Surgeons
Presidents of the Royal Society of Medicine